Victory Lap is the seventh full-length album by the punk rock band Propagandhi. It was released on September 29, 2017. It is the first Propagandhi album to feature Sulynn Hago on guitar. While Hago was originally recruited to be a live member and their predecessor David Guillas was intended to continue performing on studio releases, the album features Hago as a full band member while Guillas provided some guitar parts as a "Propagandhi alumnus".

Track listing

Writing

Frontman Chris Hannah said of the writing process:

"For most of the songs I wrote on this record I tried to go in with a different philosophy than I have in the past. Instead of labouring over every word and making everything perfectly fit some sort of end result, the rule was 'First thing out of my mouth is the first thing that goes on the paper.'"

And of his current position as a songwriter:

"I think back in the Less Talk era, it was more like, 'Give me the fuckin' bullhorn and let me talk about me.' But I've modified that position somewhat. People say they're tired of hearing white, male voices, and so am I. I'm fuckin' tired of hearing my fuckin' self."

Reception
Victory Lap peaked at No. 68 on the Billboard 200 on October 10, 2017.

Personnel

Propagandhi
Chris Hannah – guitar, vocals
Jord Samolesky – drums, backing vocals
Todd Kowalski – bass guitar, vocals
Sulynn Hago – guitar, backing vocals

Additional musician
David Guillas – additional guitar

Artwork
 Tom Brenner – cover photo
 Greg Gallinger – insert photo painting
 Avrinder Dhillon – back cover photo
 Jason Link – layout
 Todd Kowalski – layout

Production
John Paul Peters – producer
Jason Livermore – mastering

References

External links

2017 albums
Propagandhi albums
Epitaph Records albums